The Monte Albo (Monte Arbu in Sardinian) is a limestone massif  in length in the central eastern portion of Island of Sardinia, Italy.

References

Mountain ranges of Italy
Albo